The Okotoks Oilers are a junior A ice hockey team in the Alberta Junior Hockey League.  They play in Okotoks, Alberta, Canada with home games at the Okotoks Centennial Arena.

History
In June 2004, the Alberta Junior Hockey League (AJHL) board of governors approved the sale and relocation of the Crowsnest Pass Timberwolves franchise to Okotoks.  The franchise was granted a one-year leave of absence in 2004–05 to prepare for its first season in its new home.  Players from the 2003–04 Timberwolves team were loaned out to other AJHL and British Columbia Hockey League (BCHL) teams. Though dormant, the Oilers franchise was awarded the 2004–05 AJHL all-star game, which acted as a preview of the AJHL brand for the citizens of Okotoks.

The 2005–06 season was a success for the Oilers, as they finished with a record above .500 before losing to the Brooks Bandits in the first round of the playoffs, three games to two. The Oilers played their first season in Murray Arena while construction of their new facility was ongoing.

Season-by-season record
Note: GP = Games played, W = Wins, L = Losses, T/OTL = Ties/Overtime losses, Pts = Points, GF = Goals for, GA = Goals against

See also
 List of ice hockey teams in Alberta

External links
Okotoks Oilers website
Alberta Junior Hockey League website

Alberta Junior Hockey League teams
Ice hockey teams in Alberta
Ice hockey clubs established in 2005
Okotoks
2005 establishments in Alberta